Minthoini is a tribe of flies in the family Tachinidae.

Genera
Actinochaeta Brauer & von Bergenstamm, 1889
Actinominthella Townsend, 1928
Austrophasiopsis Townsend, 1933
Diaphoropeza Townsend, 1908
Dolichopodomintho Townsend, 1927
Dyshypostena Villeneuve, 1939
Hyperaea Robineau-Desvoidy, 1863
Magripa Richter, 1988
Megistogastropsis Townsend, 1916
Melanasomyia Malloch, 1935
Mesnilus Özdikmen, 2007
Mintho Robineau-Desvoidy, 1830
Minthodes Brauer & von Bergenstamm, 1889
Minthoxia Mesnil, 1968
Mongolomintho Richter, 1976
Neometachaeta Townsend, 1915
Palmonia Kugler, 1972
Paradidyma Brauer & von Bergenstamm, 1891
Plesina Meigen, 1838
Promintho Townsend, 1926
Pseudominthodes Townsend, 1933
Rossimyiops Mesnil, 1953
Sumpigaster Macquart, 1855
Tipulidomima Townsend, 1933
Vanderwulpia Townsend, 1891
Ventoplagia Richter, 2009
Xiphochaeta Mesnil, 1968
Ziminia Mesnil, 1963

References

Brachyceran flies of Europe
Brachycera tribes
Tachininae